Birgit Malsack-Winkemann (born 12 August 1964) is a German far-right politician and former judge, and a member of the "Patriotic Union". She was a member of the 19th Bundestag from 2017 to 2021 for the Alternative for Germany (AfD), of which she has been a member since 2013. After losing re-election to the Bundestag in 2021, Winkemann returned to her previous position as a judge in the Berlin regional court.

On 7 December 2022, she was arrested during a large-scale raid against an alleged right-wing terrorist association with roots stemming from within the Reichsbürger movement.

Biography
Malsack-Winkemann was born on 12 August 1964 in Darmstadt and studied jurisprudence at Ruprecht-Karls-Universität Heidelberg. From 2003 to 2017 Malsack-Winkemann was a judge for legal affairs in Berlin. In 2013 she joined the newly founded AfD and became a member of the Bundestag in 2017. In June 2021 she was nominated in 5th position on the AfD state candidate list for Bundestag, after she lost against Georg Pazderski - with the state party only winning 3 seats proportionally allocated seats, she lost re-election. 

She has been a member of the AfDs party Court of Arbitration since June 2022.

Malsack-Winkemann has two children.

December 2022 arrest

In the morning of 7 December 2022, she was arrested for her alleged involvement with a group of right-wing extremists connected to the Reichsbürger movement, which had planned a coup against the German government. She would have become the Minister of Justice of the government which would be formed if they had managed to realise their plan.

References

Living people
1964 births
Members of the Bundestag for Berlin
Politicians from Darmstadt
University of Bayreuth alumni
Members of the Bundestag 2017–2021
Members of the Bundestag for the Alternative for Germany
Female members of the Bundestag
21st-century German women politicians
20th-century German jurists
Heidelberg University alumni
Prisoners and detainees of Germany
Far-right politics in Germany